The fourth Constitution of Uruguay was in force between 1942 and 1952.

Approved in a referendum on 29 November 1942, it replaced the previous constitutional text, which had been in force since 1934.

Overview
President Alfredo Baldomir summoned a Council of State which drafted the new text. It is considered a minor reform to the previous constitution, its main change being the suppression of the "15+15"-Senate, replaced by a more traditionally elected one.

This Constitution was in force for a decade.

See also
 Constitution of Uruguay
 Alfredo Baldomir
 1942 Uruguayan constitutional referendum

References

External links
 Text of the Constitution of 1942 

1942
1942 establishments in Uruguay
1942 in law